Marhavay (also Romanized as Marḩavāy; also known as Marḩabā'ī) is a village in Cheghapur Rural District, Kaki District, Dashti County, Bushehr Province, Iran.

Population 
At the 2006 census, its population was 37, in 7 families.

References 

Populated places in Dashti County